Barking Pumpkin is an American independent record label founded by Frank Zappa in 1981 with initial distribution by CBS Records. Some releases on the label were sold only by mail order. 

The catalog has included The Old Masters box sets, which consisted of boxed reissues of albums previously released by Zappa on other labels and original material by Frank Zappa which has since been nationally released by Rykodisc in different versions, as well as original and reissued by other artists, such as Dweezil Zappa and the group Z, which consisted of Dweezil and Ahmet Zappa. After Frank Zappa died in 1993, Barking Pumpkin continued to release his posthumous albums, and new content by Z.

Catalog

References

External links 
 The official Frank Zappa website
 

Barking Pumpkin Records albums
Discographies of American artists